Count Lipót (Leopold) Pálffy de Erdőd (1764–1825) was the Count of Pozsony County and the Major General, who after the destruction of Dévény Castle negotiated with Napoleon I.

Notes

1764 births
1825 deaths
Hungarian nobility
Hungarian generals